Engure Parish is an administrative unit of Tukums Municipality, in the Courland region of Latvia.

References

Parishes of Latvia
Tukums Municipality
Courland